35 Squadron or 35th Squadron may refer to:

No. 35 Squadron RAF
No. 35 Squadron, Indian Air Force
No. 35 Squadron RAAF
35 Squadron SAAF

United States
35th Bombardment Squadron
35th Fighter Squadron
35th Flying Training Squadron
35th Reconnaissance Squadron (Heavy)

See also
35th Wing